Giancarlo Guizzardi (born 1975 in Vitoria, Brazil) is a Brazilian–Italian computer scientist specializing in conceptual modeling, enterprise modeling, applied ontology and ontology-driven information systems. He is a professor in the computer science department of the Free University of Bolzano-Bozen in Italy and a senior researcher and founding member of the Ontology & Conceptual Modeling Research Group (NEMO) in Vitoria, Brazil.

Work 
He is known for his approach towards Conceptual Modeling, which advocates that, if Conceptual Modeling is about representing conceptualizations of reality to support human understanding communication and problem-solving, it must rely on foundations that take formal ontology in philosophy, cognitive science and linguistic seriously.

He has been, for the past two decades, an active promoter of the so-called field of “Ontology-Driven Conceptual Modeling”, in general, and of the role of philosophy for Information Systems Engineering, in particular. He frequently gives keynote addresses as well as interviews on these topics.

He defended his PhD thesis in 2005 in the University of Twente. His thesis, entitled Ontological Foundations for Structural Conceptual Models, lays the foundation of what came to be known as the Unified Foundational Ontology and the OntoUML language.

Collaborations 
He has an active history of collaboration with Nicola Guarino. In fact, an initial fragment of OntoUML was considered to be an evolution of the OntoClean methodology, the first methodology for ontological analysis in computer science, proposed by Guarino and Chris Welty.

References

Brazilian computer scientists
Italian computer scientists
1975 births
People from Vitória, Espírito Santo
University of Twente alumni
Living people